Kobbari Bondam  is a 1991 Indian Telugu-language comedy film, produced by K. Achi Reddy, S. V. Krishna Reddy under Manisha Films, presented by Kishore Rathi and directed by Katragadda Raviteja. The film stars Rajendra Prasad and Nirosha, with music composed by S. V. Krishna Reddy. The film is the debut of S. V. Krishna Reddy, to which he has provided the story, screenplay, music in addition to supervising the direction. The first film he has completely directed is Rajendrudu Gajendrudu.

Plot 
Raju is an innocent, cowardly guy. Everybody teases him as Kobbari Bondam, his childhood pet name. He falls in love with Meghamala in the first scene and he approaches her with a marriage proposal. She also wants to tease him, so she sends him to her brother. He keeps two conditions for Raju to make their marriage;

 to get a job
  to give him 5 lakhs as reverse dowry.

Raju decides to give it get Meghamala's hand at any cost. By leaving his studies in the middle, he joins as an assistant at Sarvanamam, who smuggles dangerous real murder video cassettes, without knowing the reality. Once in the exchange, Sarvanamam's son Suresh stole 5 lakhs from Raju and puts the blame on him. So Sarvanamam keeps Raju's mother in his custody until he returns his money. Now Raju has to earn a total of 10 lakhs to save his mother and gain his love. To acquire it, Raju is in search of secret hidden treasures with help of his Professor. In that search, he finds an old historical coin and his Professor explains that it is the most powerful coin, which gives anonymous strength and immense self-confidence, with which one can do wonders. The rest of the story is about the wonders Raju did with the magical coin by changing his appearance into that of an obese man.

Cast 
 Rajendra Prasad as Raju
 Nirosha as Meghamala
 Kota Srinivasa Rao as Sarvanamam
 Sudhakar as Suresh
 Manto as Manto
 Mallikarjuna Rao as Meghamala's brother
 Ramana Murthy as professor
 Gundu Hanumantha Rao as coconut seller
 Kallu Chidambaram
 Gowtham Raju
 Narsing Yadav as Sarvanamam's goon
 Sri Lakshmi as Meghamala's sister-in-law
 Jayalalita as Janabettula Janamma
 Lakshmi Kanakala as Raju's mother
 Master Sairam as Babloo

Soundtrack 
Music composed by S. V. Krishna Reddy. Music released on LEO Audio Company.

References

External links 
 

1990s Telugu-language films
1991 comedy films
1991 films
Films scored by S. V. Krishna Reddy
Indian comedy films